"Honey and the Moon" is a single from Joseph Arthur. The song originally appeared on Joseph's third studio album, Redemption's Son, and was released as a radio-only promo single in 2003, but was remixed for a 2007 commercial single release. The B-sides are the album versions of two songs taken from two of Joseph's new releases, 2006's Nuclear Daydream, and 2007's Let's Just Be. The song was also featured on the FOX teen-drama series The O.C., and in the 2003 movie American Wedding.

Track listings
2003 US promo CD (UNIR 20948-2):
 "Honey and the Moon" (No Intro) – 4:12
 "Honey and the Moon" (Quick Fade) – 4:27

CD (JA06CD):
 "Honey and the Moon" (New Radio Edit) – 3:36
 "Enough to Get Away" (taken from Nuclear Daydream) – 2:47

7" (cream vinyl, JA06V):
 "Honey and the Moon" (Edit) – 3:38
 "Take Me Home" (taken from Let's Just Be) – 4:41

Digital downloads: (available separately on iTunes UK only)
 "Honey and the Moon" (Edit) – 3:38
 "Honey and the Moon" (New Radio Edit) – 3:36
 "Honey and the Moon" (Live from Brighton Concorde, 5-31-2006) – 4:52

Notes
 All songs written by Joseph Arthur, except "Take Me Home" written by Joseph Arthur and Kraig Jarret Johnson.
 "Honey and the Moon" produced by Joseph Arthur. Mixed by Tchad Blake.
 "Honey and the Moon" (new radio edit) produced by Joseph Arthur. Mixed by Chris Lord-Alge.
 "Enough to Get Away" produced by Joseph Arthur.
 "Take Me Home" produced by Joseph Arthur and The Lonely Astronauts.

Joseph Arthur songs
2007 singles
Songs written by Joseph Arthur
2002 songs
14th Floor Records singles